Zvony z rákosu is a Czech drama film. It was released in 1950.

External links
 

1950s Czech-language films
1950 films
Czechoslovak black-and-white films
Czechoslovak drama films
1950 drama films
1950s Czech films